Ernest William Adams (3 April 1922 – September 2009) was an English professional footballer who played in the Football League for Queens Park Rangers as a forward.

References
General
 . Retrieved 28 October 2013.
Specific

1922 births
2009 deaths
Footballers from Willesden
English footballers
Association football forwards
Preston North End F.C. players
Fulham F.C. players
Queens Park Rangers F.C. players
English Football League players